The Andromeda Galaxy (M31) has satellite galaxies just like the Milky Way. Orbiting M31 are at least 13 dwarf galaxies: the brightest and largest is M110, which can be seen with a basic telescope. The second-brightest and closest one to M31 is M32. The other galaxies are fainter, and were mostly discovered only starting from the 1970s.

On January 11, 2006, it was announced that Andromeda Galaxy's faint companion galaxies lie on or close to a single plane running through the Andromeda Galaxy's center. This unexpected distribution is not obviously understood in the context of current models for galaxy formation. The plane of satellite galaxies points toward a nearby group of galaxies (M81 Group), possibly tracing the large-scale distribution of dark matter.

It is unknown whether the Triangulum Galaxy is a satellite of Andromeda.

Table of known satellites
Andromeda Galaxy's satellites are listed here by discovery (orbital distance is not known). Andromeda IV is not included in the list, as it was discovered to be roughly 10 times further than Andromeda from the Milky Way in 2014, and therefore a completely unrelated galaxy.

 
* It is uncertain whether it is a companion galaxy of the Andromeda Galaxy.

** RA/DEC values marked in Italics are rough estimates.

*** Martin et al. (2009) gave aliases to several satellite galaxies of the Andromeda Galaxy that are located in Pisces. However, the name Pisces II was later used for a different galaxy that is a satellite of the Milky Way, so it is not used here.

See also
 Satellite galaxies of the Milky Way
 List of nearest galaxies
 Local Group

References

External links
Andromeda's thin sheet of satellites – Dark matter filiments or galaxtic cannibalism?
Strange Setup: Andromeda's Satellite Galaxies All Lined Up

Local Group

Andromeda (constellation)
Andromeda Galaxy